The age-area hypothesis is a concept in cultural anthropology that cultural traits tend to expand outward from their origin with time. Thus, the larger an area that a trait is found in, the older it is. 

The age-area hypothesis is controversial, and considered by some to be discredited.

References
 

Cultural anthropology